LMNO Productions, Inc. (doing business as LMNO Entertainment) is an American television production company that is headquartered in Encino, California and was founded on June 30, 1986, by Eric Schotz, known for  producing Kids Say the Darndest Things.

History

The company was founded on June 30, 1986, by Eric Schotz. On June 30, 2016, the Federal Bureau of Investigation (FBI) raided LMNO offices in Encino, California and Discovery Communications filed a lawsuit against the company due to an accounting scandal over the company's The Little Couple television show.

Television programs

Television specials and films
 ABC Fall Preview (1990)
 Put to the Test (1996)
 The World's Most Shocking Medical Videos (1999)
 The World's Greatest Pets (1999)
 Pearl Harbor: Battle in Paradise (2001)
 Man vs. Beast (2003)
 The First Annual Miss Dog Beauty Pageant (2003)
 Man vs. Beast 2 (2004)
 That's Just Wrong (2004)
 101 Things Removed from the Human Body (2005)
 101 More Things Removed from the Human Body (2007)
 Little People: Just Married (2009)

References

External links
 

American companies established in 1986
Entertainment companies established in 1986
Mass media companies established in 1986
Companies based in Los Angeles County, California
Television production companies of the United States
Entertainment companies based in California
1986 establishments in California